Bhuyera is a village located in the Ausgram II CD Block in Bardhaman Sadar North subdivision of the Purba Bardhaman district, in West Bengal, India.

Transport 

Geography

Population 
Schedule Caste (SC) constitutes 18.79% while Schedule Tribe (ST) were 9.87% of total population in Bhuyera village.

Religious beliefs and festivals
 
Durga Puja, Kali Puja and Jagaddhatri Puja are the main festivals that are celebrated in Bhuyera. Dhaneshwar Shiv Puja also a main festival of 10 villages including Bhuyera, organised Sankranti Mela on Charak Sankranti at Dhonkora. Maliara Rajbari first started Durga Puja in Bhuyera in the 17th century and is still celebrated traditionally. In the last few years, local clubs and communities have competed with each other for designing the best Durga Puja murtis (idols), mandaps (interior of abode), and pandals (bamboo and cloth makeshift enclosures) with hundreds of thousands of rupees often being spent by each club.

 
Jagaddhatri Puja is one of the main festivals of Bhuyera celebrated by locals traditionally.
The Jagaddhatri Puja of Mukherjee family, Parikhapara adjacent to Parimal Mukherjee lane, deserves a special mention in this regard. Folklore has it that this puja was started in 1920 by late Suborna Bala Mukherjee. Hundreds of people of Maliara gathers to celebrate Jagaddhatri Puja with Mukherjee family and the festival last for 3 days. The exact history of the deity is unknown, but family records date it back to 1900.
 
With respect to its tribal history, people in Bhuyera fly Kites to celebrate "Mage Porob","Baa Porob","Baraam Puja", the day of a "Ho" tribal god. This is on the last day of the month of Poush, i.e. Poush Sankranti. Apart from kite-flying, a fair is also held on Poush Sankranti. It has a rural flavour and is characterised by the trading of handicraft and household goods. The items of the trade include spades, knives and other iron tools, combs and other goods made of buffalo-horn, baskets (jhuri and dhama) and platters for husking (kula) made of bamboo and cane, etc

References 

Villages in Purba Bardhaman district